Edward Winthrop Gray (August 18, 1870, Jersey City, New Jersey – June 10, 1942, Newark, New Jersey) was an American Republican Party politician who represented New Jersey's 8th congressional district in the United States House of Representatives for two terms from 1915 to 1919.

Early life and career
Edward Gray was born in Jersey City, New Jersey on August 18, 1870, where he attended the public schools.

He was a newspaper reporter in New York City from 1894 to 1896. He was owner and publisher of the Summit Herald in 1897 and 1898, city editor and managing editor of the Newark Daily Advertiser from 1898 to 1902, and was president and general manager of the Newark Daily Advertising Publishing Co. from 1902 to 1904.

Political career
Gray was appointed by Governor Franklin Murphy a commissioner to investigate tenement-house conditions in 1902 and was a member of the board of tenement-house supervision from 1900 to 1908. Gray was secretary to Gov. Edward C. Stokes from 1904 to 1907, and was secretary of the Republican State committee from 1908 to 1913. He organized the Commercial Casualty Insurance Company in Newark in 1909.

Congress
Gray was elected as a Republican to the Sixty-fourth and Sixty-fifth Congresses, serving in office from March 4, 1915 to March 3, 1919. He was an unsuccessful candidate for election in 1918 to the United States Senate, and was an unsuccessful candidate for nomination for Representative in 1924 and for Senator in 1928.

Later career and death
After he left Congress, Gray was a writer, publisher, and lecturer. He died in Newark on June 10, 1942, and was interred there in Mount Pleasant Cemetery.

External links

Edward Winthrop Gray at The Political Graveyard

1870 births
1942 deaths
Burials at Mount Pleasant Cemetery (Newark, New Jersey)
Republican Party members of the United States House of Representatives from New Jersey